= Netribution =

Netribution – a Portmanteau of net and distribution – was launched at the end of 1999 as a free resource and magazine for European filmmakers, and became one of the largest and most popular free film industry services until its closure in 2002. It relaunched in early 2006 with an open access content system, and publishes How to Fund Your Film: the Film Finance Handbook.
